III Corps was a corps of the Army of the Republic of Vietnam (ARVN), the army of the nation state of South Vietnam that existed from 1955 to 1975. It was one of four corps in the ARVN, and oversaw the region of the country surrounding the capital Saigon.

III Corps was activated in September 1959 and controlled the country south of Phan Thiet excluding Saigon which was controlled by the Capital Military District. In 1962, President Ngô Đình Diệm decided to split the Corps into two, the former III Corps area being reduced in size to cover the area northeast of Saigon and the newly created IV Corps taking over the west and southwest. 

The Fifth Division based in Bien Hoa on the northern outskirts of Saigon was a part of III Corps, and due to the division's close proximity to the capital was a key factor in the success or failure of the various coup attempts in the nation's history.

Divisions

References 

Corps level formations of South Vietnam
Military units and formations established in 1955
Military units and formations disestablished in 1975
1955 establishments in South Vietnam